Sanctum was a Santa Clara, California-based information technology company focused on application security. Sanctum offered a firewall, AppShield, and scanner, AppScan, for application-layer security for Web environments.

In 2003 Sanctum was merged with Watchfire and the company was subsequently acquired by IBM.

History
Sanctum was founded in 1997 as Perfecto Technologies, by Eran Reshef and Gili Raanan.

The company released its first product AppShield in summer of 1999.

The company has done an extensive research in application security and applying formal methods to real life software in collaboration with Turing Award winner Professor Amir Penueli. Early research in 1996 and 1997 led to the invention, in parallel to other teams, of CAPTCHA technology, and the application for a US patent for CAPTCHA.

In 2000 the company renamed itself to Sanctum. The company was backed by investors Sequoia Capital, Intel Capital, Goldman Sachs, DLJ, Walden and Mofet.

Products
The AppShield product was the first product to inspect incoming Hypertext Transfer Protocol requests and block malicious attacks based on a dynamic policy which was composed by analyzing the outgoing HTML pages.

Later in June 2000 the company introduced AppScan the world's first Web Security Vulnerability Assessment solution. Among the first clients for AppScan were Yahoo!, Bank of America and AT&T.

References 

Computer security software companies
IBM acquisitions